Sarapatel, or Sorpotel, is a dish of Portuguese origin now commonly cooked in the coastal Konkan region of India, primarily Goa, Mangalore and East Indians of Mumbai Sarpatel. The former Estado da Índia Portuguesa colony. It is also prepared in northeastern Brazil. The word ‘sarapatel’ literally means confusion, referring to the mish-mash of ingredients which include Pork meat and offal (which includes heart, liver, tongue and even pork blood sometimes). However, in modern-day version, blood is rarely used as now getting the pure blood is slightly difficult. The meat is first parboiled, then diced and sauteed before being cooked in a spicy and vinegary sauce. 

The flavourings and spices differ from region to region, for example, some use more vinegar. The size of the pieces also varies, as does cooking technique: some sautee the meat prior to cooking it in the sauce, while others add the diced parboiled meat directly to the sauce.

In Goa and Mangalore, Sorpotel is often accompanied by "sanna" - a spongy, white, and slightly sweet steamed rice and coconut bread. However, it can also be enjoyed with bread, on rice, or in a bun as a sandwich.

History 
Made by African slaves in Brazil, the dish had the tail, ear, intestines, tongue and a hint of blood. It was a filling, rich ode to offal. The pork-loving Portuguese got it to India. What came to India was the version popular from Alentejo region of Portugal, to which the native Goan Christians and East Indians added their own tricks to make it even more interesting. It is this variety that is available today.

External links

Sorpotel Recipe
About Sorpotel
Food Story: How Sorpotel travelled from Brazil to India

Brazilian cuisine
Goan cuisine
Indian fusion cuisine
Pork dishes
Portuguese fusion cuisine